The 2010 Columbia Lions football team was an American football team that represented Columbia University during the 2010 NCAA Division I FCS football season. Columbia finished sixth in the Ivy League.  Columbia averaged 5,192 fans per game.

In their fifth season under head coach Norries Wilson, the Lions compiled a 4–6 record and were outscored 228 to 222. Alex Gross, Andrew Kennedy, Matt Moretto and Mike Stephens were the team captains.  

The Lions' 2–5 conference record placed sixth in the Ivy League standings. Columbia was outscored 174 to 147 by Ivy opponents. 

Columbia played its homes games at Robert K. Kraft Field at Lawrence A. Wien Stadium in Upper Manhattan, in New York City.

Schedule

References

Columbia
Columbia Lions football seasons
Columbia Lions football